A cockade is a knot of ribbons, or other circular- or oval-shaped symbol of distinctive colours which is usually worn on a hat or cap.

Eighteenth century

In the 18th and 19th centuries, coloured cockades were used in Europe to show the allegiance of their wearers to some political faction, or to show their rank or to indicate a servant's livery. Because individual armies might wear a variety of differing regimental uniforms, cockades were used as an effective and economical means of national identification.

A cockade was pinned on the side of a man's tricorne or cocked hat, or on his lapel. Women could also wear it on their hat or in their hair.

In pre-revolutionary France, the cockade of the Bourbon dynasty was all white. In the Kingdom of Great Britain supporters of a Jacobite restoration wore white cockades, while the recently established Hanoverian monarchy used a black cockade. The Hanoverians also accorded the right to all German nobility to wear the black cockade in the United Kingdom.

During the 1780 Gordon Riots in London, the blue cockade became a symbol of anti-government feelings and was worn by most of the rioters.

During the American Revolution, the Continental Army initially wore cockades of various colors as an ad hoc form of rank insignia, as General George Washington wrote:

Before long however, the Continental Army reverted to wearing the black cockade they inherited from the British. Later, when France became an ally of the United States, the Continental Army pinned the white cockade of the French Ancien Régime onto their old black cockade; the French reciprocally pinned the black cockade onto their white cockade, as a mark of the French-American alliance. The black-and-white cockade thus became known as the "Union Cockade".

In the Storming of the Bastille, Camille Desmoulins initially encouraged the revolutionary crowd to wear green. This colour was later rejected as it was associated with the Count of Artois. Instead, revolutionaries would wear cockades with the traditional colours of the arms of Paris: red and blue. Later, the Bourbon white was added to this cockade,  thus producing the original cockade of France. Later, distinctive colours and styles of cockade would indicate the wearer's faction; although the meanings of the various styles were not entirely consistent, and they varied somewhat by region and period.

European military

From the 15th century, various European monarchy realms used cockades to denote the nationalities of their militaries. Their origin reverts to the distinctive colored band or ribbon worn by late medieval armies or jousting knights on their arms or headgear to distinguish friend from foe in the field of battle. Ribbon-style cockades were worn later upon helmets and brimmed hats or tricornes and bicornes just as the French did, and also on cocked hats and shakoes. Coloured metal cockades were worn at the right side of helmets; while small button-type cockades were worn at the front of kepis and peaked caps. In addition to the significance of these symbols in denoting loyalty to a particular monarch, the coloured cockade served to provide a common and economical field sign at a time when the colours of uniform coats might vary widely between regiments in a single army.
   
During the Napoleonic wars, the armies of France and Russia, had the imperial French cockade or the larger cockade of St. George pinned on the front of their shakos.

The Second German Empire (1870–1918) used two cockades on each army headgear: one (black-white-red) for the empire; the other for one of the monarchies the empire was composed of, which had used their own colors long before. The only exceptions were the Kingdoms of Bavaria and Württemberg, having preserved the right to keep their own armed forces which were not integrated in the Imperial Army. Their only cockades were either white-blue-white (Bavaria) or black-red-black (Württemberg).

The Weimar Republic (1919–1933) removed these, as they might promote separatism which would lead to the dissolution of the German nation-state into regional countries again. 
When the Nazis came to power, they rejected the democratic German colours of black-red-gold used by the Weimar Republic. Nazis reintroduced the imperial colours (in German: die kaiserlichen Farben or Reichsfarben) of black on the outside, white next, and a red center. The Nazi government used black-white-red on all army caps. These colours represented the biggest and the smallest countries of the Reich: large Prussia (black and white) and the tiny Hanseatic League city states of Hamburg, Bremen and Lübeck (white and red).

France began the first Air Service in 1909 and soon picked the traditional French cockade as the first national emblem, now usually termed a roundel, on military aircraft. During World War I, other countries adopted national cockades and used these coloured emblems as roundels on their military aircraft. These designs often bear an additional central device or emblem to further identify national aircraft, those from the French navy bearing a black anchor within the French cockade.

Hungarian revolutionaries wore cockades during the Hungarian revolution of 1848 and during the 1956 revolution. Because of this, Hungarians traditionally wear cockades on 15 March.

Confederate States
Echoing their use when Americans rebelled against Britain, cockades – usually made with blue ribbons and worn on clothing or hats – were widespread tokens of Southern support for secession preceding the American Civil War of 1861–1865.

List of national cockades

Below is a list of national cockades (colors listed from center to ring):

Component states of the German Empire (1871–1918)

The German Empire had, besides the national cockade, also cockades for several of its states, seen in the following table:

See also
Cap badge
Rosette (politics)
Roundel

References

Further reading
 Prussian Staff & Specialist Troops 1791-1815, book

External links

 
Uniforms
Hats
Ceremonial clothing
Symbols